Panagaeus fasciatus is a species of ground beetle in the Panagaeinae subfamily that can be found in the US and Canada. The species is orange coloured with two black lines going across its pronotum. It prefers dry forests, in such states as Arizona and Kansas.

References

Beetles described in 1823
Beetles of North America